A  (plural: , Italian for "provincial road"), abbreviated SP, is an Italian road. Provincial roads are maintained by provinces.

In Veneto from 2002, state highways downgraded as provincial roads are maintained by regional company Veneto Strade.

A provincial road is less important than a regional road, but more important than municipal roads.

The types of provincial roads are the same ones of state highways.

See also
Transport in Italy

References
 "Strada provinciale" in the Thesaurus of Nuovo soggettario, BNCF.

Roads in Italy